This article contains a list of fossil-bearing stratigraphic units in the state of Arizona, U.S.

Sites

See also

 Paleontology in Arizona

References

 

Arizona
Stratigraphic units
Stratigraphy of Arizona
Arizona geography-related lists
United States geology-related lists